WEEP or Weep may refer to:

Common uses
 Weep, to cry
 Weep, a small opening that allows water to drain

Arts, entertainment, and media
 Weep (band), an American rock band from New York City
 WEEP (defunct), a defunct radio station in Virginia, Minnesota
 WWNL, a radio station in Pittsburgh formerly known as "WEEP"

See also
 Jesus wept